The Chana CM8 is a microvan produced by Changan Automobile.

Overview

Previewed by the Changan CM8 concept during the 2004 Chengdu Auto Show, the Chana CM8 is a 7-seater city MPV built with a monocoque bodywork which the chassis and body are a single unit. The powertrain of the Chana CM8 features a 1310 cc petrol engine producing 60 kW or 81.6 bhp and 102 Nm of torque mated to a 5-speed manual transmission.

References

External links
Chana Global Official website 

CM8
Vans
Microvans
Rear-wheel-drive vehicles
Cars of China
Cars introduced in 2004